The Silent vāv is an element of Persian and Urdu orthography resulting when a vāv is preceded by khe and followed by an alef or ye, forming the combination of  or , in which the vāv is silenced. It is always written but not typically spoken, except for in certain eastern Persian dialects wherein it is pronounced. If not followed by a long vowel, the vāv following a khe sometimes adopts the  sound of the short vowel Zamme/Pish.

History

Historical development 
The silent vāv occurs only in words of Iranian origin, and is not present in any Turkic or Arabic loanwords that entered the language. Words in Middle Persian containing the labialized voiceless velar fricative  preceding a long vowel developed such that the sound underwent delabialization and simply became the voiceless velar fricative . Despite this, the written language continues to reflect the old standards of pronunciation, hence the silent vāv remains written. These linguistic evolutions did not take place in certain areas of Greater Iran, and thus certain dialects do not have the silent vāv as a feature.

In poetry 

Historically, sometimes poetic usages of the silent vāv did not follow the traditional literary rules and guidelines.

Denotation 
This is no longer a feature of Persian orthography in any manner, with the modified letter  having no presence in the modern alphabet.

Geographical distribution. 
The standard forms of both Persian and Urdu do not pronounce the silent vāv in any situation. However, the eastern dialects of Persian, commonly known as Dari and Tajiki, as well as the Persian dialects of Kashan and some other regions of Iran, continue to pronounce a /w/ sound, meaning that the silent vāv is not a feature of the orthography of their dialects.

Examples

Notes

References

Further reading 

 Toponymic Guidelines for map and other editors – Revised edition 1998. UNGEGN, 20th session. New York, 17–28 January 2000.

Persian language
Persian orthography
Persian grammar
Silent letters
Urdu